California Village is a neighborhood in Pasadena, California. It is bordered by Sierra Madre Boulevard to the north, Foothill Boulevard to the south, the Eaton Wash to the west, and Sierra Madre Villa Avenue to the east.
Like most of the neighborhoods east of the Eaton Wash, it was developed more recently than most other neighborhoods in Pasadena.

Latitude: 34.14778 Longitude: 118.14452

Landmarks
The only commercial development in the neighborhood is a single city block on Foothill Boulevard. The neighborhood has no parks, though it is notable for straddling the Eaton Wash and the powerlines that trace its course.

Education
California Village is served by Field Elementary School, Wilson Middle School, and Pasadena High School.

Transportation
The Metro Gold Line has a terminal complex on Sierra Madre Villa Avenue and Foothill Boulevard, at the neighborhood's edge. It is served by Metro Local lines 256 and 487; Pasadena Transit routes 31, 32, 40, and 60 and Foothill Transit Route 187.

Neighborhoods in Pasadena, California